Avalon High School or Avalon School is a public high school located in the unincorporated community of Avalon, Texas, USA and classified as a 1A school by the UIL.  It is a part of the Avalon Independent School District located in southeastern Ellis County.   Avalon School was awarded National Blue Ribbon School status in 2014.  In 2015, the school was rated "Met Standard" by the Texas Education Agency.

Athletics
The Avalon Eagles compete in these sports - 

Volleyball, Cross Country, 6-Man Football, Basketball, Track, Baseball & Softball

References

External links
Avalon ISD website

Public high schools in Texas
Schools in Ellis County, Texas